Pedro Bonilla (born 28 February 1967) is a Colombian former cyclist. He competed in the team time trial at the 1988 Summer Olympics.

References

1967 births
Living people
Colombian male cyclists
Olympic cyclists of Colombia
Cyclists at the 1988 Summer Olympics
Place of birth missing (living people)